Kabirul Islam Ratan is a Bangladeshi film dance director and choreographer. In 2007, he won the Bangladesh National Film Award for Best Choreography for the film Ki Jadu Korila.

Selected films
 Ki Jadu Korila – 2007

Awards and nominations
National Film Awards

References

External links
 

Living people
Bangladeshi choreographers
Best Choreography National Film Award (Bangladesh) winners
Year of birth missing (living people)